Álvaro Calle (born 25 May 1953) is a Colombian former footballer who competed in the 1972 Summer Olympics.

References

1953 births
Living people
Association football defenders
Colombian footballers
Olympic footballers of Colombia
Footballers at the 1972 Summer Olympics
Independiente Medellín footballers
Pan American Games medalists in football
Pan American Games silver medalists for Colombia
Footballers at the 1971 Pan American Games
Medalists at the 1971 Pan American Games